Lindu people is a collection of four indigenous communities known as Anca, Tomado, Langko and Puroo in areas around Lindu Lake in Central Sulawesi, Indonesia. They belonged to the Kaili-Tomini people cluster of Sulawesi.

References

Ethnic groups in Indonesia
Sulawesi